Constitution type or body type can refer to a number of attempts to classify human body shapes:

 Humours (Ayurveda)
 Somatotype of William Herbert Sheldon
 Paul Carus's character typology
 Ernst Kretschmer's character typology
 Elliot Abravanel's glandular metabolism typology
 Sasang typology by Je-Ma Lee
 Bertil Lundman's racial classification system

See also
 Female body shape
 Enterotype
 Habitus (disambiguation)
 Phrenology
 Physiognomy

Human physiology
Anthropometry
Body shape